Kentucky is situated in the Upland South. A significant portion of eastern Kentucky is part of Appalachia.

Kentucky borders seven states, from the Midwest and the Southeast. West Virginia lies to the northeast, Virginia to the east, Tennessee to the south, Missouri to the west, Illinois to the northwest, and Indiana and Ohio to the north. Only Missouri and Tennessee, both of which border eight states, touch more.

Kentucky's northern border is formed by the Ohio River and its western border by the Mississippi River; however, the official border is based on the courses of the rivers as they existed when Kentucky became a state in 1792. Ellis Park, a thoroughbred racetrack, is located in this small piece of Kentucky. Waterworks Road is part of the only land border between Indiana and Kentucky.

Kentucky has a non-contiguous part known as Kentucky Bend, at the far west corner of the state. It exists as an exclave surrounded completely by Missouri and Tennessee, and is included in the boundaries of Fulton County. Road access to this small part of Kentucky on the Mississippi River (populated by 18 people ) requires a trip through Tennessee.

The epicenter of the 1811–12 New Madrid earthquakes was near this area, causing the Mississippi River to flow backwards in some places. Though the series of quakes changed the area geologically and affected the small number of inhabitants of the area at the time, the Kentucky Bend is the result of a surveying error, not the New Madrid earthquake.

Regions

Kentucky can be divided into five primary regions: the Cumberland Plateau in the east, which contains much of the historic coal mines; the north-central Bluegrass region, where the major cities and the capital are located; the south-central and western Pennyroyal Plateau (also known as the Pennyrile or Mississippi Plateau); the Western Coal Fields; and the far-west Jackson Purchase.

The Bluegrass region is commonly divided into two regions, the Inner Bluegrass encircling  around Lexington, and the Outer Bluegrass that contains most of the northern portion of the state, above the Knobs. Much of the outer Bluegrass is in the Eden Shale Hills area, made up of short, steep, and very narrow hills.

Climate

Located within the southeastern interior portion of North America, Kentucky has a climate that is best described as a humid subtropical climate (Köppen: Cfa), only small higher areas of the southeast of the state has an oceanic climate (Cfb) influenced by the Appalachians. The average precipitation is  a year. Kentucky has four distinct seasons, with substantial variations in the severity of summer and winter. The state rarely experiences the extreme cold of far northern states, nor the high heat of the states in the Deep South. Temperatures seldom drop below 0 degrees or rise above 100 degrees. Rain and snowfall totals about 45 inches per year.

The climate varies markedly within the state. The northern parts tend to be about five degrees cooler than those in the western parts of the state. Somerset in the south-central part receives ten more inches of rain per year than, for instance, Covington to the north. Average temperatures for the entire Commonwealth range from the low 30s in January to the high 70s in mid-July.

In general, Kentucky has relatively hot, humid, rainy summers, and moderately cold and rainy winters. Temperature means vary with northern and far-eastern mountain regions averaging five degrees cooler year-round, compared to the relatively warmer areas of the southern and western regions of the state. Days per year below the freezing point vary from about sixty days in the southwest to more than a hundred days in the far-north and far-east.

Climate data

Natural disasters

Lakes and rivers

Kentucky has more navigable miles of water than any other state in the union, other than Alaska.

Kentucky is the only U.S. state to have a continuous border of rivers running along three of its sidesthe Mississippi River to the west, the Ohio River to the north, and the Big Sandy River and Tug Fork to the east. Its major internal rivers include the Kentucky River, Tennessee River, Cumberland River, Green River and Licking River.

Though it has only three major natural lakes, Kentucky is home to many artificial lakes. Kentucky has both the largest artificial lake east of the Mississippi in water volume (Lake Cumberland) and surface area (Kentucky Lake).

Kentucky's  of streams provides one of the most expansive and complex stream systems in the nation.

Natural environment and conservation

Kentucky has an expansive park system, which includes one national park, two National Recreation Areas, two National Historic Parks, two national forests, two National Wildlife Refuges, 45 state parks,  of state forest, and 82 wildlife management areas.

Kentucky has been part of two of the most successful wildlife reintroduction projects in United States history. In the winter of 1997, the Kentucky Department of Fish and Wildlife Resources began to re-stock elk in the state's eastern counties, which had been extinct from the area for over 150 years. , the herd had reached the project goal of 10,000 animals, making it the largest herd east of the Mississippi River.

The state also stocked wild turkeys in the 1950s. There were reported to be fewer than 900 at one point. Once nearly extinct here, wild turkeys thrive throughout today's Kentucky. Hunters officially reported a record 29,006 birds taken during the 23-day season in spring 2009.

In 1991 the Land Between the Lakes partnered with the U.S. Fish and Wildlife Service for the Red Wolf Recovery Program, a captive breeding program.

Natural attractions

 Cumberland Gap, chief passageway through the Appalachian Mountains in early American history.
 Cumberland Falls, the only place in the Western Hemisphere where a "moonbow" may be regularly seen, due to the spray of the falls.
 Mammoth Cave National Park, featuring the world's longest known cave system.
 Red River Gorge Geological Area, part of the Daniel Boone National Forest.
 Land Between the Lakes, a National Recreation Area managed by the United States Forest Service.
 Big South Fork National River and Recreation Area near Whitley City.
 Black Mountain, state's highest point. Runs along the south ridge of Pine Mountain in Letcher County, Kentucky. The highest point located in Harlan County.
 Bad Branch Falls State Nature Preserve,  state nature preserve on southern slope of Pine Mountain in Letcher County. Includes one of the largest concentrations of rare and endangered species in the state, as well as a  waterfall and a Kentucky Wild River.
 Jefferson Memorial Forest, located in the southern fringes of Louisville in the Knobs region, the largest municipally run forest in the United States.
 Lake Cumberland,  of shoreline located in South Central Kentucky.
 Natural Bridge, located in Slade, Kentucky Powell County.
 Breaks Interstate Park, located in southeastern Pike County, Kentucky and Southwestern Virginia. The Breaks is commonly known as the "Grand Canyon of the South".

See also
 List of counties in Kentucky
 Coal mining in Kentucky

References

Geography of Kentucky